Mark McGivern (born 24 February 1983) is a British volleyball player. Born in Bellshill, North Lanarkshire, Scotland, he competed for Great Britain in the men's tournament at the 2012 Summer Olympics.

Career

References

Scottish men's volleyball players
Volleyball players at the 2012 Summer Olympics
Olympic volleyball players of Great Britain
1983 births
Living people
Sportspeople from Bellshill
Scottish expatriate sportspeople in France
Expatriate volleyball players in France